Ellen Hunnicutt (May 4, 1931 - June 24, 2003) was an American author.

Life
Ellen Hunnicutt was born in Portland, Indiana. She attended Ball State University, El Camino College, and the University of Wisconsin–Milwaukee, with a bachelor's degree and master's degree in 1984.

Her father was a musician and teacher and her grandfather was a violin maker.  She married an engineer; they had three sons. She turned to children's fiction, writing as "E. M. Hunnicutt."

Her work appeared in Cimarron Review, Indiana Review, Michigan Quarterly Review, Mississippi Review, Prairie Schooner, "Boys Life," and South Dakota Review.

A resident of Big Bend, Wisconsin, she taught piano and creative writing at Waukesha County Technical College, and University of Wisconsin–Milwaukee.

She died at her home in Big Bend, June 24, 2003 at age 72.

Awards
 1986  Wisconsin Arts Board Literary Arts Fellowship
 1987 Drue Heinz Literature Prize for, In the Music Library
 1988 Banta Award, for Suite for Calliope
 first prize in fiction from the Council for Wisconsin Writers
 2012 Wisconsin Library Association "Notable Wisconsin Author"

Works

Novels
 (reprint)

Short Stories
"Carrot Man", Boys Life, December 1991
"The Clearing", Wisconsin academy review, Fall 1992

Anthologies

References

External links

2003 deaths
1931 births
University of Wisconsin–Milwaukee alumni
People from Portland, Indiana
People from Big Bend, Waukesha County, Wisconsin